Richard James DeMont (born April 21, 1956) is an American former competition swimmer, world champion, and former world record-holder in multiple events.  DeMont is often remembered for the controversy arising from his disqualification at the 1972 Summer Olympics because he tested positive for a prohibited substance present in his prescription asthma medication.

Biography
DeMont was born in San Francisco, California, and he attended Terra Linda High School in suburban San Rafael, California.  He trained with the Marin Aquatic Club. As a 16-year-old, DeMont qualified to represent the United States at the 1972 Summer Olympics in Munich, Germany.  He won a gold medal for his first-place finish (4:00.26) in the men's 400-meter freestyle.  Following the race, the International Olympic Committee (IOC) stripped DeMont of his gold medal after his post-race urinalysis tested positive for traces of the banned substance ephedrine contained in his prescription asthma medication, Marax. The positive test following the 400-meter freestyle final also deprived him of a chance at multiple medals, as he was not permitted to swim in any other events at the 1972 Olympics, including the 1,500-meter freestyle for which he was the then-current world record-holder.  Before the Olympics, DeMont had properly declared his asthma medications on his medical disclosure forms, but the U.S. Olympic Committee (USOC) had not cleared them with the IOC's medical committee.

At the 1973 World Aquatics Championships in Belgrade, Yugoslavia, DeMont became the first man to swim the 400-meter freestyle in under four minutes (3:58.18). The same year he was voted World Swimmer of the Year.

In 1990 DeMont was inducted into the International Swimming Hall of Fame. In 2001 the USOC admitted that it had mishandled DeMont's medical information at the 1972 Olympics and appealed to the IOC to reinstate the medal.  To date, the IOC has not officially changed the race results nor overturned his ban.

DeMont was an assistant coach for the South African men's swim team at the 2004 Summer Olympics in Athens, Greece, and the 2008 Summer Olympics in Beijing, China.

In 2014, after being a member of the coaching staff for 24 seasons, DeMont was named the head coach of the men's and women's swimming and diving teams at the University of Arizona.

See also
 List of members of the International Swimming Hall of Fame
 List of World Aquatics Championships medalists in swimming (men)
 World record progression 400 metres freestyle
 World record progression 1500 metres freestyle
 World record progression 4 × 100 metres freestyle relay

References

External links
 

1956 births
Living people
American male freestyle swimmers
American sportspeople in doping cases
Arizona Wildcats swimming coaches
Competitors stripped of Summer Olympics medals
Doping cases in swimming
World record setters in swimming
Olympic swimmers of the United States
Pan American Games gold medalists for the United States
Pan American Games silver medalists for the United States
Swimmers from San Francisco
Swimmers at the 1972 Summer Olympics
Swimmers at the 1975 Pan American Games
World Aquatics Championships medalists in swimming
Pan American Games medalists in swimming
Medalists at the 1975 Pan American Games